Steven John Payne (born August 16, 1958) is a Canadian former professional ice hockey left winger who played for the Minnesota North Stars of the National Hockey League between 1978 and 1988. He played his entire NHL career with Minnesota and was forced into retirement by multiple cervical spine injuries.

Biography
As a youth, he played in the 1971 Quebec International Pee-Wee Hockey Tournament with a minor ice hockey team from Toronto.

Payne was drafted 19th overall by Minnesota in the 1978 NHL Amateur Draft. Payne played 613 career NHL games, scoring 228 goals and 238 assists for 466 points. His best season statistically was the 1979–80 season. He set career highs in goals (42), points (85), power-play goals (16), and plus minus with a +37 rating. He retired as the team's all-time highest scoring left wing as well as their all-time leading playoff scorer and led the North Stars to their first Stanley Cup final appearance, in 1981, with 17 goals and 12 assists in 19 games. In his book Minnesota North Stars History and Memories with Lou Nanne, Nanne stated, "The best clutch goal scorer we ever had was Steve Payne. He got more big goals than anyone."

He played in the 1980 and 1985 NHL All-Star Games. He also played for Canada in the 1979 World Championship and the '81 Canada Cup.

Payne is a long time supporter of the US military. He sits on the advisory board of the United Heroes League, a non-profit that helps children of active military families participate in hockey, baseball, football and basketball. He is also the director of the UHL Outdoors program that takes military parents and their children fishing with sports celebrities from the NHL, NFL and MLB at various locations around the US and Canada.

Payne has also supported the non-profit Project Healing Waters Fly Fishing, as the founder and director of the "Battle at Boxwood", a fundraising fly fishing event held from 2011 - 2018 at the Boxwood Gulch Ranch near Shawnee, Colorado. The event featured 20 recovering military members fishing with celebrities from the NHL, NFL and music industry and was featured on the outdoor TV series, Fly Rod Chronicles and Sportsman360, as well as in the special TV feature, "Embracing Our Troops".

He has two children, three grandchildren and lives with his wife Kim in rural West-Central Wisconsin.

Career statistics

Regular season and playoffs

International

References

External links
 

1958 births
Canadian ice hockey left wingers
Ice hockey people from Toronto
Kalamazoo Wings (1974–2000) players
Living people
Minnesota North Stars draft picks
Minnesota North Stars players
Oklahoma City Stars players
Ottawa 67's players